Asthenini is a tribe of geometer moths under subfamily Larentiinae first described by Warren in 1893. The tribe has been combined with Eupitheciini in the past, most notably by Jeremy Daniel Holloway in his work The Moths of Borneo.

Distribution
The tribe is represented in all the major biogeographical regions, but is most diverse in eastern Asia and is poorly represented in the Afrotropics. It is also poorly represented in the Neotropics if the genus Eois is excluded.

Diversity
227 species group taxa (species and subspecies) were included in the tribe in 2002. Later research re-included two genera, including the large genus Eois (about 250 species), more than doubling the number of species.

Recognized genera and species
Critical analysis by Dayong Xue and Malcolm J. Scoble  indicated 18 genera that belong to the Asthenini with 1 additional, ungrouped species. The 18 genera recognized by this research are:
 Agnibesa Moore 1888
 Anydrelia Prout 1938
 Asthena Hübner 1825
 Asthenotricha Warren 1899
 Bihastina Prout 1916
 Epicyme Meyrick 1885
 Eschatarchia Warren 1894
 Euchoeca Hübner 1823
 Hastina Moore 1888
 Hydrelia Hübner 1825
 Leucoctenorrhoe Warren 1904
 Macrohastina Inoue 1982
 Nomenia Pearsall 1905
 Palpoctenidia Prout 1930
 Parasthena Warren 1902
 Poecilasthena Warren 1894
 Polynesia Swinhoe 1892
 Venusia Curtis 1839

Later research re-included the following genera:
 Eois (but see below)
 Minoa (but see below)
 Pseudostegania Butler, 1881

Disassociated genera
The following 7 genera are sometimes associated with the Asthenini, but were excluded by the work of Xue and Scoble:
 Chaetolopha
 Chalyboclydon
 Cleptocosmia
 Pseudopolynesia
 Trichodezia

Eois and Minoa were excluded by Xue and Scoble, but later again included by Viidalepp in 2011.

Species incertae sedis 
Species 'Chalyboclydon' flexilinea was identified by Xue and Scoble as being part of the Asthenini. However, it has not been associated with a specific Asthenini genus.

References

 
Larentiinae